The 2017 Virgin Australia All-Australian team represents the best performed Australian Football League (AFL) players during the 2017 season. It was announced on 30 August as a complete Australian rules football team of 22 players. The team is honorary and does not play any games.

Selection panel
The selection panel for the 2017 All-Australian team consisted of chairman Gillon McLachlan, Kevin Bartlett, Luke Darcy, Andrew Dillon, Danny Frawley, Glen Jakovich, Chris Johnson, Cameron Ling, Matthew Richardson and Warren Tredrea.

Team

Initial squad
The initial 40-man All-Australian squad was announced on 28 August.

Final team
Adelaide,  and  each had the most selections with three.  defender Alex Rance was announced as the All-Australian captain, with West Coast forward Josh Kennedy announced as vice-captain. The team saw twelve players selected in an All-Australian team for the first time in their careers, with twelve clubs represented.

Note: the position of coach in the All-Australian team is traditionally awarded to the coach of the premiership team.

References

All-Australian Team